Jéssica Bouzas Maneiro (born 24 September 2002) is a Spanish tennis player.

Bouzas Maneiro has career-high WTA rankings of No. 174 in singles achieved on 6 February 2023 and No. 201 in doubles achieved on 9 January 2023. She has won six singles and three doubles titles on the ITF Women's Circuit.

Career
In December 2020, Bouzas Maneiro played her first singles final in Madrid, Spain. She was defeated by Conny Perrin from Switzerland. One month after finishing second in her first professional final, in January 2021, Bouzas Maneiro won her first singles title at a $15k event in Cairo. She defeated Slovak player Chantal Škamlová in the final. A week later, she won another singles title in Cairo. In March 2021, she entered the final in Gonesse, France. Another week later, in Le Havre, she lost to French Léolia Jeanjean in the quarterfinals. She was champion in the city of Heraklion in 2021, and played the final in Madrid.

In February 2022, she became champion in Villena, Spain, when she defeated American Ashley Lahey in the final. A month later, she won her second championship of the year in Palmanova, Spain. After entering the $25k final at Platja d'Aro in May 2022, she lost to compatriot Guiomar Maristany.

At the end of June in Oran, Algeria, she won a bronze medal in singles and the gold medal in doubles at the Mediterranean Games. Partnering with compatriot Guiomar Maristany, she defeated the Maltese pair of Francesca Curmi and Elaine Genovese.

Grand Slam performance timeline

Singles

ITF finals

Singles: 12 (8 titles, 4 runner–ups)

Doubles: 6 (4 titles, 2 runner–ups)

National representation

Multi-sports event
Maristany made her debut representing Spain in multi-sports event at the 2022 Mediterranean Games, she won the women's singles bronze and doubles gold medal.

Singles: 1 (bronze medal)

Doubles: 1 (gold medal)

References

External links
 
 

2002 births
Living people
Spanish female tennis players
Mediterranean Games gold medalists for Spain
Mediterranean Games bronze medalists for Spain
Competitors at the 2022 Mediterranean Games
Mediterranean Games medalists in tennis
21st-century Spanish women